The 1936 Sugar Bowl, part of the 1935–36 bowl game season, took place on January 1, 1936, at Tulane Stadium in New Orleans, Louisiana. The competing teams were the LSU Tigers, representing the Southeastern Conference (SEC), and the TCU Horned Frogs, representing the Southwest Conference (SWC). TCU won the game, 3–2.

Teams

LSU

The 1935 LSU squad finished the regular season 9–1 and as SEC champions with loss coming against Rice in the season opener. The Sugar Bowl appearance marked the first ever postseason bowl game for LSU.

TCU

The 1935 TCU squad finished the regular season with a record of 11–1. The only loss of the season came in their final conference game against SMU by a score of 20–14. The appearance marked the first for TCU in the Sugar bowl and the second all-time bowl appearance.

Game summary
In a game dominated by both defenses, all five points were scored in the second quarter. TCU's Taldon Manton scored first on a 36-yard field goal. LSU scored their only points when Sammy Baugh was called for a safety after being pressured by Gaynell Tinsley, and called for intentional grounding.

References

Sugar Bowl
Sugar Bowl
LSU Tigers football bowl games
TCU Horned Frogs football bowl games
Sugar Bowl
Sugar Bowl